Alexander Joseph Kaletchitz (March 2, 1898 – April 1, 1994) was an American boxer who competed in the 1928 Summer Olympics.

He was born in New York City and died in Palmetto, Florida.

In 1928 he was eliminated in the quarter-finals of the heavyweight class after losing his bout to Sverre Sørsdal.

1928 Olympic results
Below is the record of Alexander Kaletchitz, an American heavyweight boxer who competed at the 1928 Amsterdam Olympics:

 Round of 16: bye
 Quarterfinal: lost to Sverre Sørsdal (Norway) by first-round knockout

External links
profile

1898 births
1994 deaths
Boxers from New York City
Heavyweight boxers
Olympic boxers of the United States
Boxers at the 1928 Summer Olympics
American male boxers
People from Palmetto, Florida